Joseph L. "Zastrow" Simms (May 1940  April 2013) was an American civil rights activist in Annapolis, Maryland. His life was the subject of a 2006 documentary entitled "Pip & Zastrow."

Awards 
In January 1997, Simms received the Dr. Martin Luther King Jr. Peacemaker Award.

References 

1940 births
2013 deaths
American civil rights activists
People from Annapolis, Maryland
Activists from Maryland